is a Japanese manga artist.

Works

Anime
Seraphim Call
Samurai Spirits 2: Asura Zanmaeden

Printed Works
Artbooks
Angel Flavor
Seven Colors of Wind
Manga

Heaven
Where the wind returns to (Oneshot)
Light Novel
 (Illustrations)

Games
Aquarian Age TCG
Asuka 120%
 (PS1 game)
Dimension 0 (Zero)
Monster Collection

References

External links
Seventh Heaven (Official Website) 
Seventh Heaven blog 

Manga artists
Japanese bloggers
Living people
1967 births